The Farrar Homeplace is a historic mansion in Shelbyville, Tennessee, U.S.. It was built circa 1848 for James Franklin Farrar. According to the "family tradition", the house played a minor role during the American Civil War. Indeed, five soldiers of the Union Army died in the house after they drank the laudanum that Farrar was using to heal his wounds from the Battle of Bull Run as a member of the Confederate States Army. By 1990, the house still belonged to the Farrar family. It has been listed on the National Register of Historic Places since November 7, 1990.

Notes

References

Houses on the National Register of Historic Places in Tennessee
Greek Revival architecture in Tennessee
Houses completed in 1848
National Register of Historic Places in Bedford County, Tennessee
Buildings and structures in Shelbyville, Tennessee